Deborah Baxter (born 1954) is an English actress who appeared in the films A High Wind in Jamaica and The Wind and the Lion.

Career 
Born in England, Baxter was selected from 1,000 applicants for the starring role of Emily Thornton in the film A High Wind in Jamaica, after having been discovered by talent agent Maureen Riscoe. She received much acclaim for her part in the film. After taking part in much stage work, she returned to film ten years later, being cast by fan John Milius in The Wind and the Lion (1975), playing Alice Roosevelt, daughter of U.S. President Theodore Roosevelt. Her only film role in recent years was a walk-on in The Calling (2000).

Personal life 
Baxter married and retired from film to focus on family, though she continued acting in theatre and television. She currently lives in Kent with her husband, David Carr, a solicitor.

Filmography

Film

Television

References 

English film actresses
1953 births
Living people
20th-century English actresses